The 50 Greatest Pieces of Classical Music is a selection of classical works recorded by the London Philharmonic Orchestra with conductor David Parry. Recorded at Abbey Road Studios, Royal Festival Hall and Henry Wood Hall in London, the album was released in digital formats in November, 2009 and as a 4-CD set in 2011. The 50 Greatest Pieces of Classical Music has sold over 200,000 copies and spent over three days as one of the top 10 classical albums on iTunes.

Track listing

Ludwig van Beethoven – Symphony No. 5 in C minor, Op. 67, "Fate": I. Allegro con brio
Richard Wagner – The Valkyrie: Ride of the Valkyries
Edvard Grieg – Peer Gynt Suite No. 1 Op. 46: Morning Mood 
Antonio Vivaldi – The Four Seasons, Op. 8, "Spring": Allegro
Samuel Barber – Adagio for Strings
Frédéric Chopin – Nocturne No. 2 in E-Flat major, Op. 9
Johann Pachelbel – Canon in D Major
Carl Orff – Carmina Burana: O fortuna
Johann Sebastian Bach – Orchestral Suite No. 3 in D major, BWV 1068: Air
Gustav Holst – The Planets, Op. 32: Jupiter, the Bringer of Jollity
Claude Debussy – Suite bergamasque, L 75: Clair de lune
Giuseppe Verdi – Nabucco: Chorus of the Hebrew Slaves (Va, pensiero, sull'ali dorate)
Wolfgang Amadeus Mozart – Piano Concerto No. 21 in C major, K. 467: II. Andante
Johann Sebastian Bach – Brandenburg Concerto No. 3 in G major, BWV 1048: Allegro
Jules Massenet – Thaïs: Meditation
Antonín Dvořák – Symphony No. 9 in E minor, Op. 95, "From the New World": II. Largo
Johann Strauss II – On the Beautiful Blue Danube, Op. 314
Johannes Brahms – Hungarian Dance No. 5 in G minor
Pyotr Ilyich Tchaikovsky – Swan Lake Suite, Op. 20: Scene
Erik Satie – Gymnopédie No. 1
Wolfgang Amadeus Mozart – Requiem, K. 626: Lacrimosa Dies illa
Ludwig van Beethoven – Bagatelle in A minor, Wo Op. 59, "Für Elise"
Edward Elgar – Pomp and Circumstance, Op. 39: Land of Hope and Glory
Georges Bizet – Carmen Suite No. 2: Habanera
Ludwig van Beethoven – Symphony No. 9 in D minor, Op. 125, "Choral": Ode an die Freude
Jacques Offenbach – The Tales of Hoffmann: Barcarolle
Remo Giazotto – Adagio in G minor for Strings and Organ (after T. Albinoni)
Wolfgang Amadeus Mozart – Serenade No. 13 in G major, K. 525, "Eine kleine Nachtmusik": I. Allegro
Gioachino Rossini – The Barber of Seville: Overture
Ludwig van Beethoven – Piano Sonata No. 14 in C-sharp minor, Op. 27:2, "Moonlight Sonata": Adagio sostenuto
Bedřich Smetana – Má Vlast (My Fatherland): Vltava (The Moldau River)
Luigi Boccherini – String Quintet in E major, Op. 13: Minuet (mislabeled – should be Op. 11, No. 5 (G. 275): Minuet)
Wolfgang Amadeus Mozart – Symphony No. 40 in G minor, K. 550: I. Allegro Molto
Antonín Dvořák – Slavonic Dance No. 2, Op. 72
Charles Gounod – Ave Maria (after J.S. Bach)
Jean Sibelius – Finlandia, Op. 26
Wolfgang Amadeus Mozart – Piano Sonata No. 11 in A major, K. 331: Rondo alla turca
Wolfgang Amadeus Mozart – The Magic Flute, K. 620: Overture
George Frideric Handel – The Messiah, HWV 56: Hallelujah Chorus
Edvard Grieg – Peer Gynt Suite No. 1, Op. 46: In the Hall of the Mountain King
Gabriel Fauré – Pavane
Johann Sebastian Bach – Double Concerto in D minor for Two Violins, BWV 1043: Vivace
Georges Bizet – L'Arlésienne Suite No. 1: Prelude
Johann Strauss I – Radetzky March, Op. 228
Ludwig van Beethoven – Egmont, Op. 84: Overture
Stanley Myers – Cavatina
Arcangelo Corelli – Concerto Grosso No. 8 in G minor, Op. 6: "Christmas Concerto": Allegro 
Sergei Rachmaninoff – Vocalise, Op. 34
Giuseppe Verdi – Messa da Requiem: Dies irae – Tuba mirum
Gustav Mahler – Symphony No. 5 in C-sharp minor: Adagietto

Charts

References

External links
All Music

X5 Music Group albums
50 Greatest Pieces of Classical Music
Classical music compilation albums
London Philharmonic Orchestra albums
https://classicalbeast.com/best-classical-music-pieces/